UCBC is a Christian bilingual university in development in the town of Beni, Democratic Republic of the Congo.

Organization 
The development of UCBC is supported the Congo Initiative (CI-UCBC), a Christian charity in Wisconsin.

Educational activities

Preparatory year 
CI/UCBC aligns preparatory year with its academic program. The curriculum focuses on teaching English as means of communication and medium of instruction; computer skills are taught to bring students into the modern world of computer literacy for research and communication; general courses, work methodology, and CI-UCBC philosophy and values are also taught to prepare students for studies at UCBC.

References

External links
University website

Beni
Universities in the Democratic Republic of the Congo
2006 establishments in the Democratic Republic of the Congo